Chaetostigmoptera is a genus of flies in the family Tachinidae.

Species
C. angulicornis (Curran, 1930) 
C. crassinervis (Walton, 1913)
C. manca (Greene, 1934)
C. mitis (Curran, 1927)
C. montivaga (Villeneuve, 1919)
C. rostrata (Coquillett, 1898)

References

Tachinidae genera
Exoristinae
Taxa named by Charles Henry Tyler Townsend
Diptera of North America